Darlington is a large market town in County Durham, North East England.

Darlington may also refer to:

People 
 Darlington (surname)
 Christy Darlington, American musician
 Sidney Darlington, American electrical engineer and inventor
 Darlington Matambanadzo, Zimbabwean cricketer
 Darlington Michaels, South African actor
 Darlington Nagbe, American footballer
 Those who held the position of Earl of Darlington

Fictional characters 
 Lord Darlington, a character in the 1893 play Lady Windermere's Fan by Oscar Wilde
 Lord Darlington, a character in the 1989 novel The Remains of the Day by Kazuo Ishiguro

Places

England
Darlington (borough), local government borough that includes the town of Darlington and surrounding area
Darlington (UK Parliament constituency), a constituency represented in the House of Commons

Australia
Darlington, New South Wales, an inner Sydney suburb
Darlington, Queensland, a locality in the Scenic Rim Region.
Darlington, South Australia, an Adelaide suburb
Darlington, Victoria, a small rural township with postcode 3271 
Darlington, Western Australia, a suburb of Perth
Darlington, a town on Maria Island, Tasmania
Darlington Probation Station, a former penal colony on Maria Island, Tasmania

Canada
Darlington, New Brunswick, a former village, now part of Dalhousie
Darlington, Ontario
Darlington Nuclear Generating Station
Port Darlington, Ontario, a rural community in Clarington
Darlington, Prince Edward Island
Darlington, a neighbourhood and district in the Côte-des-Neiges–Notre-Dame-de-Grâce borough of Montreal
Darlington Provincial Park, Ontario

United States
Darlington, Florida
Darlington, Indiana
Darlington, Louisiana
Darlington, Maryland
Darlington, Missouri
Darlington, New Jersey
Darlington, Ohio
Darlington, Pennsylvania
Darlington, South Carolina
Darlington Raceway, a stock car racing track hosted by the South Carolina town
Darlington, Wisconsin, a city
Darlington (town), Wisconsin, surrounding the city of Darlington
Darlington County, South Carolina
Darlington Falls, a series of small waterfalls in Forestburg Scout Reservation

Other places
 Darlington Township (disambiguation)

Sports teams 
In Darlington, England:
 Darlington F.C., a professional football team
 Darlington R.F.C., a rugby union club
 Darlington Mowden Park R.F.C., a rugby union club

Other
 Darlington (SEPTA station), Chester Heights, Pennsylvania
 Darlington School, a private school in Rome, Georgia
 Darlington transistor, a way of connecting transistors
 , a steamship operating during the American Civil War

See also
 
 
 Darling (disambiguation)
 Darlingtonia (disambiguation)
 Electoral district of Darlington (disambiguation)
 Dallington (disambiguation)